Mint chocolate chip is an ice cream flavor composed of mint ice cream with small chocolate chips. In some cases the liqueur crème de menthe is used to provide the mint flavor, but in most cases peppermint or spearmint flavoring is used. Food coloring is usually added to make it green, but it may be beige or white in "all natural" or "organic" varieties.

According to the International Dairy Foods Association (IDFA), 3% of all ice cream sold in 2000 was mint chocolate chip, making it the 10th-most popular flavor of ice cream. In a July 2017 survey by IDFA, mint chocolate chip was ranked as America's 4th most popular ice cream flavor.

Because of its popularity, the flavor is used in other foods such as cookies and meringues.  Ice cream manufacturer Baskin-Robbins has created a hard candy named "mint chocolate chip" that tastes similar to their ice cream of the same name (which is one of their "permanent flavors").

Some brands name it chocolate (or choco) chip mint, mint 'n chip, or just mint chip.

History
Dutch people invented mint ice cream and then Baskin Robbins cites Mint Chocolate Chip as being one of the original 31 flavors when they began operations in 1945. 
Howard Johnson's restaurants were serving the flavor by the early 1950s, which would become a common flavor into the 1960s and 70s. Previously, Howard Johnson's was responsible for inventing chocolate chip ice cream under George R. Pitman.

The domestic terrorist Timothy McVeigh's last meal before he was executed for the 1995 Oklahoma City bombing was two pints of mint chocolate chip ice cream in the federal penitentiary in Terre Haute, Indiana.

See also
 List of ice cream flavors
 Mint chocolate

References

Flavors of ice cream
Chocolate desserts
Frozen desserts